William Jerome McCormack  (January 24, 1924 – November 23, 2013) was an American prelate of the Catholic Church who served as Auxiliary bishop of the Archdiocese of New York from 1987 to 2001.

Biography
William Jerome McCormack was born in New York City ordained a priest on February 21, 1959.

McCormack was appointed auxiliary bishop of the Archdiocese of New York as well as Titular bishop of Nicives on December 23, 1986, and consecrated bishop January 6, 1987.

Bishop McCormack retired as auxiliary bishop of New York on October 30, 2001.

References

External links
New York Archdiocese

20th-century American Roman Catholic titular bishops
1924 births
2013 deaths